Vega Independent School District is a public school district based in Vega, Texas (USA).

Located in Oldham County, the district extends into a small portion of Deaf Smith County.

The district operates three schools on one campus.
 Vega High School (Grades 9–12)
Vega Junior High School (Grades 6-8)
 Vega Elementary School] (Grades K–4)
 2006 National Blue Ribbon School

In 2009, the school district was rated "recognized" by the Texas Education Agency.

References

External links
 Vega ISD

School districts in Oldham County, Texas
School districts in Deaf Smith County, Texas